The Gianluigi Porelli EuroLeague Executive of the Year is an annual award of Europe's premier level men's basketball league, the EuroLeague. The award was introduced in the 2004–05 season. It is given to the league's best club CEO of each season. The winner receives the trophy after the end of the season, in recognition of their efforts to reach the highest levels of success with their club.

History
José Antonio Querejeta, of Baskonia, was the first recipient of the award, as his team reached the EuroLeague 2004–05 season's EuroLeague Final. In 2014, the award was officially named after Gianluigi Porelli, long-time owner of Virtus Bologna and first president of ULEB.

EuroLeague Club Executive of the Year

References

External links
Official Webpage on the 2015 Award

Executive of the Year